Warrington Central railway station is one of three main railway stations serving the town of Warrington in Cheshire, England. It is located on the southern route of the Liverpool to Manchester Lines (the former Cheshire Lines Committee route between Liverpool and Manchester), being situated approximately halfway between the two cities.

The third is Warrington West, which has much of the same services as Central, and opened in 2019.

History
The suffix Central was added in 1875.

Passenger station
The station is located on a raised embankment on the eastern side of where the line crosses Winwick Street, on the northern edge of the town centre. As a result of Warrington residents agitating to have the railway come closer to the town centre. A loop was constructed into the town and  station and goods yard was constructed on it. The loop and station opened in 1873; the direct route, otherwise known as the Warrington avoiding line, was not opened until 1883.

The original station building, which faces away from the town and is not easily seen by passengers, is an impressively long one-storey fine Italianate building of twenty bays in yellow brick with decorative stonework, numerous rusticated round-headed windows, a projecting central block with balustrades. The western end has a pavilion with a pyramidal roof.

It had two platforms on either side of two running lines with a subway between them at the Winwick Street end, this subway was later opened out to provide access direct from Winwick Street to each platform.

The station was rebuilt in 1983 with a street-level entrance facing on to Winwick Street. Lifts to both platforms were installed in June 2008. The station was refurbished in 2011 with improvements to "customer facilities".

Goods station

There was a goods yard and shed to the north of the lines and west of the station.

The original goods shed was adjacent to the main running lines, it had one line running through it, with a further goods platform to its north. The goods yard was able to accommodate most types of goods including live stock and was equipped with a five ton crane.

It was replaced in 1897 by a larger building set further back from the main lines, on the site of the original goods platform. This warehouse was a three-storey buff-red brick with segmental windows set in brick panels decorated with moulded Accrington brick. The dominant feature of the warehouse is the series of large concrete panels under the roofline displaying the name of the CLC and its owning companies. It is recorded in the National Heritage List for England as a designated Grade II listed building.

There were several cattle pens to the north-west of the goods yard and several short bay platforms immediately to the west of the passenger station. The goods yard crane had been upgraded to ten-tons.

The goods depot was the last on the line, goods traffic ceased and the depot closed in 1982. 

The warehouse has been redeveloped into apartments with several new build blocks occupying the former goods yard site.

Engine shed
Sometime prior to 1893 a single road engine shed was provided to the south of the station, immediately behind the Liverpool bound platform. The shed was a sub-shed of Brunswick which usually supplied three locomotives. Turntable facilities were available on the spur to Whitecross Ironworks approximately half a mile away from the station. The shed had been demolished by 1938, leaving just a stabling road.  By 1955 there were two stabling sidings with a headshunt. It became a sub-shed of Trafford Park when Brunswick closed in 1961 and probably closed around 1966.

Accidents and incidents
On 4 November 1880 a Cheshire Lines passenger train from Liverpool came slightly into collision with the rear of a Midland goods train, there were no injuries.

Facilities
From street level, passengers climb six steps or a short ramp to reach the booking office, and climb further steps or use the lifts to reach the platforms. The station has a customer service office, toilets, waiting rooms, a newsagent and a coffee stall. Outside there is a car park and a taxi rank. The station is located close to Warrington Bus Interchange.

Services
As of the May 2022 timetable, an average of eight trains an hour stop at Warrington Central at off-peak times. Some early morning and late evening services only operate between Warrington and either Manchester or Liverpool.

Late services run to Nottingham only.

Notes

References

Bibliography

External links

Railway stations in Warrington
DfT Category D stations
Former Cheshire Lines Committee stations
Railway stations in Great Britain opened in 1873
Railway stations served by East Midlands Railway
Northern franchise railway stations
Railway stations served by TransPennine Express